Vincent Price is an American academic administrator serving as the 10th and current President of Duke University. Price was previously the 29th Provost of the University of Pennsylvania before replacing Richard H. Brodhead as President of Duke University.

Education
Price studied at Santa Clara University where he received a B.A. in English in 1979. He received a Master's Degree in Communication from Stanford University in 1985, followed by a Ph.D in 1987.

Career
Price was the chair at the Department of Communication Studies at the University of Michigan prior to his tenure at the University of Pennsylvania. While at UPenn he held the positions of Interim Provost, Associate Provost for Faculty Affairs, Chair of the Faculty Senate, and Associate Dean of the Annenberg School for Communication at the University of Pennsylvania.

Price served as the editor-in-chief of the Public Opinion Quarterly from 1997 to 2001.

Price was announced as the 10th President of Duke University on December 2, 2016, and he assumed office on July 1, 2017. Since 2017, Price has served as a trustee of the National Humanities Center at Research Triangle Park. Since 2017 he has lived in the J. Deryl Hart House, the official residence for Duke's presidents.

Price wrote a book entitled Public Opinion in 1992. It was reviewed in the Public Opinion Quarterly by John P. Robinson, of the University of Maryland, College Park, who called it an "indispensable and insightful guide to the historical and intellectual roots of our profession". The book is 92 pages long and examines and contrasts the ideas of Plato, John Locke and Walter Lippman with current laboratory findings of group dynamics and cognitive psychology. The book examines a lack of consensus on the definition of "public opinion". Robinson wrote that, "The work establishes Price as a major contributor to a field that has yet to address adequately many of the fundamental issues that he has articulated."

Selected works
Public Opinion SAGE, 1992

Awards and honors
The International Communication Association's K. Kyoon Hur Dissertation Award.
The American Association in Journalism and Mass Communication's Nafziger-White Dissertation Award.
The University of Michigan College of Literature, Science, and the Arts' Excellence in Education Award.
The World Association for Public Opinion Research's Robert M. Worcester Award.
The American Association for Public Opinion Research's Award of Recognition.

See also 
Trinity College of Arts and Sciences
Duke University
 Richard H. Brodhead
Duke Kunshan University

References 

Year of birth missing (living people)
Living people
University of Pennsylvania faculty
Chief Administrators of the University of Pennsylvania
University of Michigan faculty
Academic journal editors
Santa Clara University alumni
Stanford University alumni
Place of birth missing (living people)
Presidents of Duke University